The Maly Theatre, or Mali Theatre, may refer to one of several different theatres:

 The Maly Theatre (Moscow), also known as The State Academic Maly Theatre of Russia, in Moscow (founded in 1756 and given its own building in 1824)
 The Maly Theatre (St.Petersburg), also known as The Academic Maly Drama Theatre, also known as The European Theatre, in St.Petersburg (founded in Leningrad in 1944)
 The Karl Knipper Theatre, formerly in St Petersburg
 The Maly Opera Theatre in Leningrad (1918–1998), before 1918 and since 2007 known as the Mikhaylovsky Theatre